The 1968–69 Princeton Tigers men's basketball team represented the Princeton University in intercollegiate college basketball during the 1968–69 NCAA University Division men's basketball season. The head coach was Pete Carril and the team captain was Christopher Thomforde. The team played its home games in the Dillon Gymnasium on the university campus before the January 25, 1969, opening of Jadwin Gymnasium on the university campus in Princeton, New Jersey.  The team was the champion of the Ivy League, which earned them an invitation to the 25-team 1969 NCAA Division I men's basketball tournament.  The team was Princeton's first undefeated Ivy League champion, and earned Carril his first of eleven NCAA Division I men's basketball tournament invitations.  The team helped Princeton end the decade with a 72.6 winning percentage (188–71), which was the tenth best in the nation.

The team posted a 19–7 overall record and a 14–0 conference record. The team entered the tournament riding an eleven-game winning streak and having won fifteen of their last sixteen games, but they lost their March 8, 1969 NCAA Division I men's basketball tournament East Regional first-round game against the  72–63 at Reynolds Coliseum in Raleigh, North Carolina.

Both John Hummer and Geoff Petrie were selected to the All-Ivy League first team.  Petrie, who led the conference in scoring with a 23.9 average in conference games, was also an All-East selection.  Thomforde was selected in the 1969 NBA Draft by the New York Knicks with the 96th overall selection in the 7th round. Hummer led the conference in field goal percentage with 55.4%.  Petrie and Hummer would become the only Tiger teammates to both be drafted in the first round of the NBA Draft (in the same draft no less) when they were selected eighth and fifteenth overall in the 1970 NBA Draft by the Portland Trail Blazers and the Buffalo Braves.  The two were part of a trio of 1970 NBA first-round draftees from the Ivy League that included number thirteen selection Jim McMillian of Columbia.  Hummer was the first NBA draft pick by the expansion Buffalo Braves. Petrie would share the 1971 NBA Rookie of the Year Award with Dave Cowens.
Brian Taylor was selected in the 1972 NBA Draft by the Seattle SuperSonics with the 23rd overall selection in the second round while Reggie Bird was selected by the Atlanta Hawks with the 55th overall selection in the fourth round.

Regular season
The team posted a 19–7 (14–0 Ivy League) record.

! = at New York
@ = ECAC Holiday Classic at New York
 # = at Charlotte, N.C.
$ = NCAA first round at Raleigh, N.C.

Home games in CAPS

NCAA tournament
The team lost in the first round of the 1969 NCAA Division I men's basketball tournament.

3/8/69 in Raleigh, N.C.: St. John’s 72, Princeton 63

Awards and honors
 Geoff Petrie
 First Team All-Ivy League
 Ivy League Scoring Champion
 All-East
 John Hummer
 First Team All-Ivy League
 Chris Thomforde
 Second Team All-Ivy League
 NCAA Postgraduate Scholar

Players drafted into the NBA
Five players from this team were selected in the NBA Draft.

References

Princeton Tigers men's basketball seasons
Princeton
Princeton
Princeton Tigers
Princeton Tigers